was a Japanese female idol group. The trio was formed when they were attending Holy Peak Voice Actor's School. All the members are also voice actresses recently represented by Universal Music (Japan) LLC.

Members

  
 Sayaka Takenouchi (Sta-chan)
 Yurika Takagi (Yuripon)

References

J-pop music groups